
Gmina Międzychód is an urban-rural gmina (administrative district) in Międzychód County, Greater Poland Voivodeship, in west-central Poland.

The gmina contains part of the protected area called Pszczew Landscape Park.

Villages
Apart from the town of Międzychód, Gmina Międzychód contains the villages and settlements of Bielsko, Chojna, Dormowo, Drzewce, Dzięcielin, Głażewo, Gorzycko, Gorzyń, Gralewo, Kaliska, Kamionna, Kamionna-Folwark, Kamionna-Wiktorowo, Kaplin, Kolno, Krzyżkówko, Lewice, Łowyń, Mierzyn, Mierzynek, Mnichy, Mniszki, Mokrzec, Muchocin, Muchocinek, Piłka, Popowo, Przedlesie, Puszcza, Radgoszcz, Radusz, Sarzyce, Skrzydlewo, Sowia Góra, Tuczępy, Wielowieś, Zamyślin, Zatom Nowy, Zatom Stary, Zielona, Żmijowiec and Zwierzyniec.

Neighbouring gminas
Gmina Międzychód is bordered by the gminas of Drezdenko, Kwilcz, Lwówek, Miedzichowo, Przytoczna, Pszczew, Sieraków and Skwierzyna.

References

External links
Polish official population figures 2006

Miedzychod
Międzychód County